Carnate-Usmate railway station is a railway station in Italy. It is located at the cross of the Lecco–Milan railway with the Seregno–Bergamo railway. It serves the municipalities of Carnate and Usmate Velate.

Services
Carnate-Usmate is served by line S8 of the Milan suburban railway service, and by the Milan–Carnate–Bergamo and Carnate–Seregno regional lines, all operated by the Lombard railway company Trenord.

Accidents and incidents

On 19 August 2020, a train ran away from Paderno d'Adda and derailed at Carnate-Usmate. Three people were injured.

See also
 Milan suburban railway service

References

External links

Railway stations in Lombardy
Milan S Lines stations
Railway stations opened in 1873